Society for Information Management (SIM) is a professional organization of over 5,000 senior information technology (IT) executives, chief information officers, prominent academicians, selected consultants, and others.

History

The idea of SIM began during a break session at the Association for Computing Machinery (ACM) conference held in Las Vegas in August 1968. A conversation between Robert Head with the Software Resource Group and Herb Schwartz with the United States Atomic Energy Commission ensued on how current professional societies did not emphasize the managerial aspects of computing enough nor did they serve as a good communication mechanism between data processing managers and executive managers.
That conversation was the basis for the formation of The Society for Management Information Systems (SMIS) which in 1982 became the Society for Information Management.

A founding committee was formed and the first meeting was held on November 22, 1968, at the U.S. Atomic Energy Commission in Washington D.C. The founders included Joseph P. Cunningham, Richard E. Dooley, Dr. James C. Emory, Robert B. Forest, Robert V. Head, Dr. Alan J. Rowe, James G. Rude, M.H. Schwartz, Robert G. Stevens, W. Robert Widener and Robert K. Wilmouth.

The first (founding) conference titled "Bridging the Gap Between the Management Function and Information Technology" with 250 attendees was held at the University of Minnesota on September 8–9, 1969.

Current and past presidents or chairs 

=

Governance

Advanced Practices Council 

Advanced Practices Council (APC) is a forum for senior IT executives who commission exclusive research and share cross-industry perspectives. APC was founded in 1991 by Warren McFarlan of the Harvard Business School.

SIM's Annual Conference
From 1995 to 2002, the conference was called SIM Interchange Annual Conference.

From 2003 to 2016, the conference was called SIMposium.

From 2017 to 2020, the conference was called SIM Connect Live.

In 2021, SIM partnered with TechServe Alliance to host the first-ever SIM National Executive Retreat in Amelia Island, FL. The two organizations co-hosted the IT & Engineering Talent Forum, a collaborative deep-dive exploration of the perennial talent challenge in IT & engineering staffing. The 2022 event will be hosted in Palm Springs, CA November 6-8. 

Host Cities

 1995 Hosted by the Boston Chapter at Disney World, Orlando, FL

SIM Women 
SIM Women is a network inside the Society for Information Management to promote communication, mentorship and career development amongst the female members.

In January 2007 SIM Women began with the New Jersey, NY Metro and Fairfield-Westchester chapters. In April 2007 the ladies of Philadelphia were added, and in February 2008 the ladies of Boston joined SIM Women as well.  There was great participation from each new chapter.  In May 2008 the ladies from Central CT and the DC/Capital area were added.  In August 2008 the ladies of the Toronto and Raleigh chapters joined. In September 2008 the ladies of Tennessee, Central and South Florida chapters were asked to participate, and Atlanta and Alabama joined in October.  In December 2008 the Wisconsin, Minnesota, St. Louis, and Northeast Ohio chapters were welcomed. In January 2009 ladies of Houston, Dallas-Fort Worth, and Indianapolis joined the ranks. Chicago and Detroit ladies joined in the Spring of 2009. SIM women continued to add chapters every month and covered every SIMI chapter by June 2009.

To date, SIM Women has held monthly conference calls and multiple successful networking events.  SIM Women’s conference calls are typically the last Wednesday of the month at 3:00 pm EST.  Executive coaches, successful CIOs, and networking gurus are brought in to facilitate the calls and meetings.  Topics covered included: Personal Branding, Peer Communication, Defining Your Personal Success, Internal Networking, Personal Accountability, Industry Visibility, and Mentoring Defined.  SIM Women also rotates face-to-face networking events around the country.

SIM Leadership Institute 
The SIM Leadership Institute was formed in 2021 to offer leadership programs for everyone, at every stage of their career. Programs include the Regional Leadership Forum, the Executive Regional Leadership Forum, and the Emerging Leader Development Program which launched in 2021. In 2022, the SIM Leadership Institute began offering the IT Management & Leadership Professional (ITMLP) workshop.

Regional Leadership Forum (RLF) 

Regional Leadership Forum (RLF) is an intensive, ten-month leadership development program focused on creating authentic leaders. Since 1992 over 3000 graduates and more than 300 sponsors have found RLF the key to developing leadership effectiveness. RLF offers a curriculum of intense reading, open exchanges on leadership practices, and interactive learning focusing on team-building, creative thinking and listening skills.

Founded by Richard Dooley, the first Regional Leadership Forum was held in Chicago in 1992 and was originally called the "SIM Chapter-Hosted Learning Forum".

Emerging Leader Development Program - ELD 
SIM's ELD leadership development offering is a 100% online program. It is an orientation for first-time leaders needing greater familiarity with key skills required to be an effective leader in IT.  The program is entirely customized to focus on an individual's specific areas of necessary leadership development.

Local chapters and leadership
The strength of the SIM Organization is built around local its local Chapters. There are currently 36 local chapters throughout the United States and Canada.

Boston chapter 
The geographic area of Boston Chapter members consists of Eastern and Central Massachusetts, Maine, New Hampshire, Vermont and Rhode Island. The Boston Chapter of SIM was formed through the efforts of Dick Harris, John Dacey and Edgar Canty.  In the Fall of 1976 Mr.  Harris, who was then ClO at Colonial Gas, was at a meeting in Chicago at which SIM National (then called the Society for the Management of Information Systems - SMIS) was encouraging chapter formation.  Harris obtained a listing of SIM members in the Boston area, and called Canty and Dacey to arrange an organizing meeting.  The organizing meetings were held at Babson College through the Fall of 1976 and into the Spring of 1977 and, in addition to Harris, Canty and Dacey, involved Don Brown, Les Ball, Chris Bullen and Charles Hewitt.

The first Boston SIM meetings began in the Fall of 1977 with the meeting locations alternated between Babson College and the MIT Faculty Club. Dick Harris was the first Chapter Chairman, and Jerry Kanter was the first speaker. The Articles of Organization were submitted to the Massachusetts Secretary of State’s office in May 1981, signed by Edgar Canty. The officers were Les Ball, President; Dave Callahan, Clerk; and Arthur Sarazini, Treasurer. Chapter Directors were Bill Synnott, John Dacey, Dick Harris and Dave Callahan. The Charter of Incorporation was received from national SMIS on June 18, 1981.

The Boston Chapter's programs include the MIT Sloan School of Management CIO Symposium, The Leadership Development Roundtable, SIM Silver, Sharpen the Leadership Saw, CIO Roundtables in both the Providence, RI and greater Boston areas,  a Practitioner's Roundtable, a Consultants Roundtable, a Help Desk Roundtable and two all-day CIO Summits/Forums. It currently supports the following Outreach programs: Year Up, Teen Voices, Common Impact and Tech Boston.

Past and current presidents (chair) of the Boston chapter

Portland chapter
The Portland Chapter of SIM was initially formed as a satellite of the Seattle SIM Chapter in 1996 through the efforts of Bill Harrison, Norm Alexander, Liz Alexander, Bill Henderson, and Fred Pond. Independent since 1999, the Portland Chapter primarily draws members from the Portland, Oregon, and Vancouver, Washington areas but also has many active members from the Salem and Corvallis regions. As of mid-2020, the chapter boasts more than 170 active members. The region is home to 2.46 million people(2020 Census), over 20 colleges and universities, and two professional sports teams. Besides being known for high-tech manufacturing, Portland is home to the highest number of athletic apparel and outdoor recreation companies in the United States. Locally headquartered firms include Nike and Columbia Sportswear.  In addition, the North American headquarters of Adidas, Keen, Danner Boots, SnowPeak, Poler Outdoor Stuff, Wildfang, and Leatherman. International brands such as Nau, Lucy, Dakine, and Under Armour also have a significant presence in Greater Portland.

Past and current presidents of the portland chapter

St. Louis chapter
The St. Louis Chapter of SIM was formed in 2004 through the efforts of Bob Rouse, Eric Gorham, Judy Winkler, David Kocs, Terry Werner and many RLF graduates.  The first meeting was held at Southwestern Bell (now ATT) in May 2004 with Darwin John as the speaker.  Geographically, the chapter includes the metropolitan St. Louis region, including surrounding counties in Missouri and Illinois; the region is home to 2.9 million people, 16 colleges and universities, and 9 Fortune 500 companies.

The St. Louis SIM Charter was received at the New York SIMposium in the fall of 2004.  Since then many chapter members have served on national SIM boards and committees.

From its beginning the Chapter concentrated on leadership programs at monthly meetings.  In 2006 it established the annual Leadership Workshop, a 2.5-day event featuring CIO leaders and networking opportunities.  In 2007 Paul Klover organized the first Charity Golf Tournament; it annually provides scholarships for undergraduate students in greater St. Louis.
The Chapter is also the primary organizer of a large annual technology conference, Gateway to Innovation, which includes biotech, healthcare, government, and information technology.  Drawing 1,400 participants, high-tech start-ups, 50 vendors and leading speakers, the conference provides a forum for the community to meet and highlight progress and developments.  The conference also gives back into the local community, donating more than $825,00  since the first year.

Past and current presidents of the St. Louis chapter

See also
 Chief Information Officer
 Chief Technology Officer

References

Professional associations based in the United States